Gretchen Dutschke-Klotz (born Gretchen Klotz, March 3, 1942 Oak Park, Illinois) is a German-American activist, and author. In West Berlin and West Germany in 1960s she was active with her husband Rudi Dutschke in the Socialist Students Union (SDS) and the Federal Republic's broader “extra-parliamentary opposition” (APO).

Life 
Gretchen Klotz was born in conservative, suburban Oak Park, Illinois. She majored in philosophy at Wheaton College where she first participated in student demonstrations. During a semester studying German at the Goethe Institute, Munich, she met Dutschke, a charismatic figure among radical students in West Berlin. In March 1965 she moved to Germany and married him while taking up studies at Free University of Berlin.  

Following an assassination attempt on her husband in April 1968, she, and the first of their three children, moved with him to Cambridge, England, and then Aarhus, Denmark. Six years after Rudi Dutschke's death in 1979 from complications arising from his injuries in 1968, she moved back to the United States, returning to Berlin in 2009. 

She has published memoirs and reflections on the her, and Rudi Dutschke's, experience of the "anti-authoritarian" student movement in 1960s which, she believes, "changed Germany".

Works 

 Rudi Dutschke. Wir hatten ein barbarisches, schönes Leben. Eine Biographie. Kiepenheuer und Witsch, Köln 1996, .
 als Hrsg.: Rudi Dutschke: Jeder hat sein Leben ganz zu leben. Die Tagebücher 1963–1979. Kiepenheuer und Witsch, Köln 2003, .
 1968. Worauf wir stolz sein dürfen. Kursbuch Kulturstiftung gGmbH, Hamburg 2018, .

References

External links 

1942 births
Living people
People from Oak Park, Illinois
American activists
American writers
American women writers
21st-century American women